Terra Nostra is a Brazilian telenovela, produced and broadcast by TV Globo in 1999. The telenovela is written by Benedito Ruy Barbosa and directed by Jayme Monjardim.

The story is set in the late 19th century and takes place at a time when slaves were freed in Brazil and there was a need for workers, especially on Brazilian coffee fazendas (plantations). This partly resulted many Italians migrating to Brazil, looking for employment and a better life. Unlike many other telenovela stories, the characters are not larger than life in "Terra Nostra." Instead, they are everyday people who make ordinary decisions. Consequently, the viewers can relate to what is happening in the story.

Musical director Marcus Viana compiled several traditional Italian songs, performed by musicians such as Charlotte Church, Caetano Veloso, Zizi Possi, and Jerry Adriani. The soundtrack also includes original instrumental music by Viana.

Plot
The telenovela takes place in Brazil between the end of nineteenth century and early twentieth century. This historical telenovela tells the story of these Italian immigrants. It focuses on the relationship of Giuliana Esplendore (Ana Paula Arosío) and Matteo Batistela (Thiago Lacerda) who meet each other during the voyage to Brazil. Most of the story takes place in a coffee farm in São Paulo.

Giuliana and Matteo immediately fall in love and plan a life together. Unfortunately, fate and some people do not plan it that way. A series of mishaps befall the couple and keep them apart. When they finally reunite, their conduct affects not only their lives, but also other people they have met along the way.

After docking, Giuliana and Matteo became lost and followed different paths. She is welcomed by Francesco (Raul Cortez), a banker millionaire friend of his deceased parents. Francesco is married to Jeanett, an haughty and arrogant woman, and father of Marco Antonio, a bon vivant.

Matteo meanwhile works on the farm of Gumercindo (Antonio Fagundes), a coffee baron who is married to Maria do Socorro. While he is a loving father to his daughter Angélica, he is cruel to his other daughter, Rosana (Carolina Kasting).

Marco Antonio, son of Francesco, falls madly in love with Giuliana, who rejects him in her determination to find her love, Matteo. However, when she discovers Matteo is expecting a son, Marco Antonio there sees the chance to be with her. Marco asks Giuliana to marry him and, in fear, she accepts.

Meanwhile, on the farm of Gumercindo, Matteo's charm enchants Angélica and Rosana. While Angélica is a shy girl, Rosana is impulsive and has strong personality. Rosana invests in Matteo despite being repeatedly rejected by him. However, to force Matteo to marry her, Rosana seduces Matteo and makes love with him. To Angélica Angelica join the convent, Gumercindo accepts the wedding proposal of Augusto, a young man with dreams of becoming a politician.

Augusto, however, maintains an affair with Paola, a beautiful and fiery Italian who arrived in the same ship that Matteo and Giuliana had. Anacleto, her father, forces Augusto to take responsibility of Paola and Augusto and purchases a home for the her in São Paulo, living together without being married. Subsequently Angélica and Augusto marry and move to São Paulo, and Paola becomes Angelica's friend. In realizing that Augusto is happily married, Paola relinquishes her hope of marrying him.

Gumercindo approaches Francesco with a business proposition. At this point, Matteo is already married with Rosana, with whom he is expecting a son, and Giuliana had a daughter, Annie, with Marco. But when the real desires of Giuliana and Matteo's son is uncovered, the marriage of Francesco and Jeanette falls apart, and Giuliana also separates from Marco.

The story concludes with Giuliana marrying Matteo and them expecting a child together, and Matteo adopts Aniña.

Moral issues arise which produce fruitful debate for the television viewers. There are no simple answers because none of the characters or issues are strictly right or wrong, black or white. The issues and personalities are gray and will cause the viewers to change their minds during the storyline.

Cast
 Ana Paula Arósio as Giuliana Splendore
 Thiago Lacerda as Matteo Battistella
 Carolina Kasting as Rosana  Telles de Aranha
 Marcello Antony as Marco Antônio Magliano
 Antônio Fagundes as Gumercindo Telles de Aranha
 Débora Duarte as Maria do Socorro Teles de Aranha
 Raul Cortez as Francesco Magliano
 Ângela Vieira as Janete Magliano
 Maria Fernanda Cândido as Paola
 Paloma Duarte as Angélica Teles de Aranha 
 Gabriel Braga Nunes as Augusto Marcondes
 Antônio Calloni as Bartolo Migliavacca
 Lu Grimaldi as Leonora
 Cláudia Raia as Hortênsia
 Odilon Wagner as Altino Marcondes
 Elias Gleizer as Padre Olavo
 Raymundo de Souza as Renato
 Roberto Bonfim as Agente Justino
 Jackson Antunes as Antenor
 José Dumont as Batista
 André Luiz Miranda as Júlio Francisco Santana (Tiziu)
 Débora Olivieri as Inês
 Danton Mello as Bruno
 Tânia Bondezan as Mariana
 Gésio Amadeu as Damião
 Mário César Camargo as Anacleto
 Adriana Lessa as Naná
 Fernanda Muniz as Luísa
 Adhenor de Souza as Juvenal
 Sônia Zagury as Antônia
 Fábio Dias as Amadeo
 Paulo de Almeida as Toninho
 Bianca Castanho as Florinda
 Guilherme Bernard as José Alceu
 Juan Alba as Josué
 Tarciana Saad as Matilde
 Lolita Rodrigues as Dolores
 Nicolas Prattes as Francesquinho

References

1999 telenovelas
1999 Brazilian television series debuts
2000 Brazilian television series endings
Television series set in the 19th century
Television series set in the 20th century
Brazilian telenovelas
TV Globo telenovelas
Television shows set in São Paulo
Portuguese-language telenovelas
Television series about immigration
Child abduction in television